Fritz Moser (11 February 1901 – 10 September 1978) was an Austrian speed skater and rower. He competed in three speed skating events at the 1928 Winter Olympics. He also competed in the men's double sculls event at the 1936 Summer Olympics.

See also
 List of athletes who competed in both the Summer and Winter Olympic games

References

1901 births
1978 deaths
Austrian male rowers
Austrian male speed skaters
Olympic rowers of Austria
Olympic speed skaters of Austria
Rowers at the 1936 Summer Olympics
Speed skaters at the 1928 Winter Olympics
Place of birth missing
20th-century Austrian people